Soka Gakkai is a Japanese Buddhist organisation. Soka Gakkai and some international branches have held an examination called "Kyogaku shiken(study exam)" which aims to deepen the practices of Soka Gakkai as to understand their background theoretical rationale embedded in Nichiren's teachings, as well as the history of Soka Gakkai, in particular, the life of the three presidents. This examination encourages members to do practices based on Soka Gakkai's guideline "Faith, practice, and study" well balanced. 
	 
The examination offers several levels (but the higher levels of examination have been held occasionally). The most basic (easiest) examination is called "Ninyo shiken" or Basic exam. Soka Gakkai has widely encouraged to take the Ninyo shiken for young and/or early career members, and also opens for the non-members who are interested in Soka Gakkai and/or Nichiren Buddhism/philosophy.
	 
In terms of more difficult levels over the Ninyo shiken, young division members in particular are encouraged to challenge the difficult, but profound part of Nichiren's theory. This tradition can be seen in the president Toda and Ikeda who themselves taught the most challenging part of the writings to university division members such as The Record of the Orally Transmitted Teachings (Ongi kuden) and Treaties on One Hundred and Six Matters (Hyaku-roku-ka-sho).
	 	
The examination asks a part or the whole of several (generally 2 to 4 per an exam) texts of Nichiren's writings based on their difficulties. The selected writings for the exam, including five major writings, are below:
	 
 On Establishing the Correct teaching for the Peace of the Land (Rissho Ankoku Ron) 
 The Opening of the Eyes (Kaimoku-sho) 
 The Object of Devotion for Observing the Mind (Kanjin-no Honzon-sho) 	
 The Selection of the Time (Senji-sho)  	
 On Repaying Debts of Gratitude (Ho'on-sho) 
 The Record of the Orally Transmitted Teachings (Ongi kuden) 
 On Attaining Buddhahood in This Lifetime (Isshō jōbutsu shō) 	
 The True Aspect of All Phenomena (Shohō jissō shō) 	
 The Heritage of the Ultimate Law of Life (Shōji ichidaiji kechimyaku shō)
 The Actions of the Votary of the Lotus Sutra (Shuju onfurumai gosho) 	
 Letter from Sado (Sado gosho) 
 Letter to the Brothers (Kyōdai shō)

The examination also asks to discuss why Soka Gakkai can be the proper followers of Nichiren even though Nichiren Shōshū (so called Nikken sect in Soka Gakkai)  excommunicated them.

References

Soka Gakkai